Bob, Rob or Robert Malone may refer to:

Robert W. Malone (born 1959), American physician and biochemist
Bob Malone (born 1965), American keyboardist, singer and songwriter                            
Robert Malone (American football) (born 1988), punter